Gerald C. Mann (January 13, 1907 – January 6, 1990) was an American football player and the attorney general of Texas from 1939 to 1944.

Mann studied at Southern Methodist University, where he was twice named to all-conference football teams and was nicknamed the "Little Red Arrow." He subsequently worked his way through Harvard Law School; first with a job at a garment factory, later as a minister at a Congregationalist church.

After returning to Texas, Mann worked as an assistant attorney general under James V. Allred. Mann was a progressive and a strong supporter of Franklin D. Roosevelt. He was elected attorney general of Texas in 1938 and held that post until he resigned in December 1943. Mann aggressively pursued an agenda of trust-busting.

Mann ran for the U.S. Senate in the 1941 special election, called after the death of Senator Morris Sheppard. His opponents included Lyndon B. Johnson, then a member of the United States Congress, and Governor Pappy O'Daniel, who won the seat.

After resigning as Attorney General, Mann resumed private law practice in Dallas. Remaining active in Democratic politics, he was Texas director of the Kennedy-Johnson campaign in 1960.

Mann died in 1990.

References

Bibliography
Robert A. Caro, The Years of Lyndon Johnson: The Path to Power
 

1907 births
Texas Attorneys General
SMU Mustangs football players
College Football Hall of Fame inductees
1990 deaths
Harvard Law School alumni
20th-century American lawyers
American football quarterbacks
20th-century American politicians